Scrobipalpa obtemperata is a moth in the family Gelechiidae. It was described by Edward Meyrick in 1925. It is found in Egypt.

References

Scrobipalpa
Moths described in 1925